Ōmi Station is the name of two train stations in Japan:

 Ōmi Station (Aichi) (大海駅)
 Ōmi Station (Niigata) (青海駅)